Anzola is a surname. Notable people with the surname include:

 Alfredo José Anzola (1974 – 2008), founder and the former CFO of Smartmatic
 Edgar J. Anzola (1893 - 1981), Venezuelan pioneering engineer, filmmaker, radio broadcaster, writer, journalist and cartoonist
 Ignacio Anzola (born 1999), Venezuelan football player
 Marco Tulio Anzola Samper (1892-?), Colombian lawyer and writer

See also 

 Anzola (disambiguation)

surnames